Rishi Arothe (born 12 November 1995) is an Indian cricketer who plays for Baroda. He made his first-class debut on 30 October in the 2015–16 Ranji Trophy. He made his List A debut on 10 December 2015 in the 2015–16 Vijay Hazare Trophy.

References

External links
 

1995 births
Living people
Indian cricketers
Baroda cricketers
People from Vadodara